The Greenwood School District is a public school district located in Greenwood, Arkansas, United States. Established in 1881 by court order as Greenwood School District #25, the district since the 2010–11 school year supports one high school, one junior high school, one middle school, and two elementary schools.

In addition to Greenwood, the district includes southern portions of Fort Smith, a portion of Barling, and a small piece of land in Bonanza.

Schools 
Public schools administered by the district include:
 Westwood Elementary (Grades K-4)
 East Pointe Elementary (Grades K-4)
 East Hills Middle School (Grades 5–6)
 Wells Jr. High School (Grades 7–8)
 Greenwood Freshman Center (Grade 9)
 Greenwood High School (Grades 10–12)

See also

References

External links
 

School districts in Arkansas
Education in Sebastian County, Arkansas
1881 establishments in Arkansas
School districts established in 1881